Midnight to Dawn is Triple J's overnight youth show presented by DJs and mid-dawn hosts broadcast from nationally. The program runs from 1am to 6am with cassette tapes. except for The Friday Night Shuffle on Fridays and Mix Up Exclusives on Saturdays. the program for late weekends replacing the simulcast of Rage (now broadcast on ABC1).

External links
 Triple J radio

Triple J programs